Medvedovo is a rural locality (a selo) in Andreyevskoye Rural Settlement, Kishertsky District, Perm Krai, Russia. The population was 213 as of 2010. There are 6 streets.

Geography 
Medvedovo is located 17 km east of Ust-Kishert (the district's administrative centre) by road. Pyzhyanovo is the nearest rural locality.

References 

Rural localities in Kishertsky District